Luka Plantić (born 29 October 1996) is a Croatian professional boxer. As an amateur, he won the bronze medal at the 2022 European Amateur Boxing Championships in the light heavyweight (-81 kg) category.

Amateur boxing career
In 2014, Plantić was Croatian youth middleweight champion, won the gold medal at the European Youth Championships in Zagreb, the silver medal at the Youth World Boxing Championships in Sofia, and the bronze medal at the Summer Youth Olympics in Nanjing.

In the adult category, Plantić was Croatian middleweight champion in 2015, 2016 and 2017 and Croatian light heavyweight champion in 2020 and 2021. in April 2016, he was eliminated in the preliminary round of the European Olympic qualification in Samsun against Arjon Kajoshi, and lost in the quarter-finals of the U22 European Championships in Brăila against Viktor Daschkewitsch in March 2017. In 2019, he won the Balkan Championships in Antalya.

In the European Olympic qualification in London in March 2020, Plantić defeated Umar Jambekov before the tournament was interrupted due to the COVID-19 pandemic. In the continuation of the qualification in Paris in June 2021, he defeated Gor Nersesyan and Emmet Brennan, before he was narrowly defeated by Benjamin Whittaker 2-3 in the semifinals and thus qualified for the 2020 Summer Olympics in Tokyo.

Professional boxing career
Plantić made his professional debut against Moris Markowitsch on 17 March 2018. He won the fight by a fifth-round knockout. His next professional bout came four years later, as he was booked to face Geard Ajetovic on 19 February 2022. Ajetovic retired from the fight at the end of the third round. Plantić made a step-up against the experienced Ryno Liebenberg on 1 September 2022. He won the fight by a fourth-round knockout, flooring Liebenberg with an uppercut.

Plantić faced the multiple-time world title challenger Khoren Gevor for the vacant WBC International Silver super middleweight title on 17 December 2022, at the Sportska Dvorana Bilankusa in Solin, Croatia. He won the fight by unanimous decision, with scores of 97–93, 100–90 and 99–92.

Professional boxing record

References

1996 births
Living people
Sportspeople from Zagreb
Croatian male boxers
Olympic boxers of Croatia
Boxers at the 2020 Summer Olympics
Boxers at the 2014 Summer Youth Olympics